Desolation Boulevard is the third studio album by the British glam rock band Sweet, originally released in the United Kingdom in November 1974. Two noticeably different versions of the album were released: one by RCA Records in Europe, and another by Capitol Records in the United States, Canada and Japan. The album contains the band's best known songs, "The Ballroom Blitz" and "Fox on the Run".

The RCA version contains the single "Turn It Down" and the original recording of "Fox on the Run." The Capitol version, released in the United States in July 1975, includes the band's 1973 hit single "The Ballroom Blitz" and the single version of "Fox on the Run." In the U.S., the album peaked at #25 on October 25, 1975.

Desolation Boulevard is considered by many to be the band's best album. Andy Scott, Sweet's guitarist, said of  Desolation Boulevard: "Such diversity only proves that the band was never going to be just formulaic, giving this album a definitive place in Sweet history".

Cover artwork
The album artwork was done by art design group Hipgnosis, famous for working with the likes of Pink Floyd, Genesis, The Alan Parsons Project, and Led Zeppelin. The background photo was shot near the entrance of a rock music club called Filthy McNasty's, located at 8852 Sunset Boulevard in West Hollywood, California. Today, it is the site of The Viper Room, which is where actor River Phoenix died of a drug overdose on Halloween morning in 1993.

Track listing
All songs written and composed by Brian Connolly, Steve Priest, Andy Scott and Mick Tucker except where noted.

RCA release
Side one
 "The Six Teens" (Mike Chapman, Nicky Chinn) – 4:02
 "Solid Gold Brass" – 5:33
 "Turn It Down" (Chapman, Chinn) – 3:30
 "Medusa" ("Medussa", on remastered CD editions 1999 and 2005) (Scott) – 4:45
 "Lady Starlight" (Scott) – 3:12
Side two
 "The Man with the Golden Arm" (Elmer Bernstein, Sylvia Fine) – 8:27
 "Fox on the Run" – 4:47
 "Breakdown" – 3:06
 "My Generation" (Pete Townshend) – 3:59

Bonus tracks on 1997 reissue
  "Burning" – 4:07
 "Rock & Roll Disgrace" – 3:50

Bonus tracks on 1999 reissue
  "I Wanna Be Committed" – 3:10
 "Teenage Rampage" (single A-side) – 3:32

Bonus tracks on 2005 reissue
  "Teenage Rampage" (Chapman, Chinn) – 3:52
 "Own Up, Take a Look at Yourself" (B-side of "Teenage Rampage") – 3:58
 "Burn on the Flame" (B-side of "The Six Teens") – 3:37
 "Someone Else Will" (B-side of "Turn It Down") – 3:25
 "Medussa" (home demo – previously unreleased) – 5:51
 "Burn on the Flame" (home demo – previously unreleased) – 3:57
 "I Wanna Be Committed" (Chapman, Chinn) – 3:10
 "Fox on the Run" (7" version) – 3:24
 "Miss Demeanor" (B-side of "Fox On The Run") – 3:17

Capitol release

The Capitol version of Desolation Boulevard was released in the United States and Canada in July 1975. It was different from the U.K. version and included several songs from their previous album Sweet Fanny Adams in addition to the "Ballroom Blitz" and "Fox on the Run" singles.
Side one
 "Ballroom Blitz" (Chapman, Chinn) – 4:00
 "The Six Teens" (stylized as "The 6-Teens") (Chapman, Chinn) – 4:04
 "No You Don't" (Chapman, Chinn) – 4:36
 "A.C.D.C." (Chapman, Chinn) – 3:28
 "I Wanna Be Committed" (Chapman, Chinn) – 3:14
Side two
 "Sweet F.A." (Scott, Tucker, Connolly, Priest) – 6:16
 "Fox on the Run" (Scott, Tucker, Connolly, Priest) (single version) – 3:28
 "Set Me Free" (Scott) – 3:59
 "Into the Night" (Scott) – 4:25
 "Solid Gold Brass" (Scott, Tucker, Connolly, Priest) (with guitar overdub) – 5:35

Personnel

Sweet 
Brian Connolly – lead vocals (except as noted)
Steve Priest – bass, lead vocals (UK tracks 9, 18; US track 3), backing vocals
Andy Scott – guitars, synthesizer, lead vocals (UK tracks 5, 6; US track 9), backing vocals
Mick Tucker – drums, percussion, backing vocals

Charts

Weekly charts

Year-end charts

Certifications and sales

References

The Sweet albums
1974 albums
Albums produced by Mike Chapman
RCA Records albums
Capitol Records albums
Albums with cover art by Hipgnosis